The Purbek Kalk Formation is a geologic formation in Germany. It preserves fossils dating back to the Cretaceous period.

See also

 List of fossiliferous stratigraphic units in Germany

References
 

Cretaceous Germany